Pais is a Portuguese surname. Notable people with the surname include:

Abraham Pais (1918–2000), American physicist
Ángel País (born 1987), Uruguayan footballer
Arie Pais (born 1930), Dutch politician
Bruno Pais (born 1981), Portuguese triathlete
Didier Païs (born 1983), French wrestler
Diego Joaquín País (born 1976), Argentine footballer
Elísio Pais (born 1998), Portuguese footballer
Elza Pais (born 1958), Portuguese sociologist and politician
Epitácio Pais (1924–2009), Goan Indian writer
Ettore Pais (1856–1939), Italian historian and politician
Fábio Pais (born 1996), Portuguese footballer
Frank País (1934–1957), Cuban revolutionary 
Gualdim Pais (1118–1195), Portuguese crusader and Knight Templar
João Pedro Pais, Portuguese musician
José da Silva Pais (1679–1760), Portuguese colonial administrator
Josh Pais (born 1958), American actor
Leonardo Pais (born 1994), Uruguayan football player
Melissa Pais (born 1983), Indian actress
Nicolae Păiș (1887–1952), Romanian naval officer
Rene Pais (born 1988), Estonian DJ and record producer
Salvatore Pais, American engineer
Sidónio Pais (1872–1918), Portuguese politician and diplomat

Portuguese-language surnames